Floyd Lawyer (February 6, 1888 – death date unknown) was an American Negro league outfielder in the 1910s.

A native of Schoharie, New York, Lawyer played for the Schenectady Mohawk Giants in 1913. In four recorded games, he posted two hits in nine plate appearances.

References

External links
Baseball statistics and player information from Baseball-Reference Black Baseball Stats and Seamheads

1888 births
Year of death missing
Place of death missing
Schenectady Mohawk Giants players